Claudel Andre Lubaya Aucun is a Congolese politician and Union for the Congolese Nation Member of the National Assembly of the Democratic Republic of the Congo.

He is the son of politician André-Guillaume Lubaya.

References

Living people
Members of the National Assembly (Democratic Republic of the Congo)
Governors of Kasai-Occidental
Union for the Congolese Nation politicians
Governors of provinces of the Democratic Republic of the Congo
Kasai-Occidental
1968 births
21st-century Democratic Republic of the Congo people